Viktor Nikolayevich Tregubov (born 13 April 1965 in Shakhty) is a Russian weightlifter, Olympic champion and world champion. He won a gold medal in the heavyweight 1 class at the 1992 Summer Olympics in Barcelona.

References

1965 births
Living people
People from Shakhty
Russian male weightlifters
Soviet male weightlifters
Weightlifters at the 1992 Summer Olympics
Olympic weightlifters of the Unified Team
Olympic gold medalists for the Unified Team
Olympic medalists in weightlifting
Medalists at the 1992 Summer Olympics
World Weightlifting Championships medalists
Sportspeople from Rostov Oblast